The India Report was prepared by Charles Eames and Ray Eames in 1958.

The Government of India had asked for recommendations on a programme of training in design that would serve as an aid to the small industries; and that would resist the present rapid deterioration in design and quality of consumer goods. Charles Eames, American industrial designer and his wife and colleague Ray Eames, visited India for three months at the invitation of the Government, with the sponsorship of the Ford Foundation, to explore the problems of design and to make recommendations for a training programme. The Eameses toured throughout India, making a careful study of the many centres of design, handicrafts and general manufacture. They talked with many persons, official and non-official, in the field of small and large industry, in design and architecture, and in education. The report emerged as a result of their study and discussions. It stipulated the underlying spirit needed to promote a suitable national design outlook and advocated the setting up of an indigenous design legacy that involved applications of modern disciplines and old traditions to meet the challenges of contemporary India.

Following the report, the Government set up the National Institute of Design in 1961 as an autonomous national institution for research, service and training in Industrial Design and Visual Communication.

References

External links
 The India Report on the NID website

Indian design
1958 documents
National Institute of Design